This list of converts to nontheism includes individuals who formerly identified with a religious affiliation but have since then openly rejected their former religion and theism and became nontheist. The list is organised by former religious affiliation and theism.

Former Buddhists

Former Christians

Former Hindus 

 Kamal Haasan – despite being born into a Hindu Brahmin family, declared himself an atheist 
 Goparaju Ramachandra Rao – Indian activist for atheism; wrote in We Become Atheists, "I was conventionally orthodox and superstitious in the days of my boyhood. I believed in the claims of divine revelations by my parental aunt."
 Ram Gopal Varma – born into a Hindu family; claimed himself atheist
 Vinayak Damodar Savarkar – president of Hindu Mahasabha; founder of the Hindutva movement; atheist; did not define "Hindutva" by religion, and used to publicly advertise lectures on atheism and the non-existence of God
 Shreela Flather, Baroness Flather of Windsor and Maidenhead – first Hindu woman in British politics; described herself as a "Hindu atheist"
 Rajeev Khandelwal – Indian film and television actor; states himself an atheist

Former Jews

Former Muslims 

 As'ad Abu Khalil – Lebanese professor of political science at California State University, Stanislaus; describes himself as an "atheist secularist"
 Zackie Achmat – South African anti-HIV/AIDS activist; founder of the Treatment Action Campaign
 Ismail Adham – Egyptian writer and philosopher
 Mina Ahadi – Iranian-born pacifist, founder of the German organization Central Council of Ex-Muslims
 Javed Akhtar – Indian writer, lyricist, TV show host, secular and nationalist activist
 Mirza Fatali Akhundov – 19th-century Azerbaijani playwright and philosopher
 Waleed Al-Husseini – Qalqilyan blogger, writer, secular humanist, and founder of the Council of Ex-Muslims of France
 Ayaan Hirsi Ali – Somali-born Dutch feminist, writer, and politician
 Ramiz Alia – Albanian communist leader and former president of Albania
 Bisi Alimi – Nigerian gay rights activist based in the United Kingdom
 Kareem Amer – Egyptian blogger
 Mustafa Kemal Atatürk – Turkish field marshal, statesman, secularist reformer, and author; a deist or an atheist or an agnostic
 Humayun Azad – Bangladeshi author, poet, scholar and linguist
 Hassan Bahara – Moroccan-Dutch writer
 Pelin Batu – Turkish actress and television personality
 Hafid Bouazza – Moroccan-Dutch writer
 Parvin Darabi – Iranian-born American writer and women's rights activist
 Turan Dursun – Turkish author; was once a Turkish mufti; later authored many books critical of Islam
 Afshin Ellian – Iranian professor
 Enver Hoxha – Communist dictator who declared Albania the first atheist state
 Ismail Kadare – World-renowned Albanian writer
 Sarmad Kashani – 17th-century mystical poet and sufi saint; arrived from Persia to India; beheaded for assumed heresy by the Mughal emperor Aurangzeb; renounced Judaism, briefly converting to Islam and then Hinduism; later denounced all religions and rejected belief in God
 Raheem Kassam – British conservative activist
 Al-Ma'arri – blind Arab philosopher, poet and writer
 Lounès Matoub – Algerian Berber Kabyle singer and activist
 Asif Mohiuddin – Bangladeshi blogger and secularist
 Seema Mustafa – Indian journalist, political editor and Delhi Bureau Chief of The Asian Age newspaper
 Maryam Namazie – Iranian communist, political activist and leader of the British apostate-organization Council of Ex-Muslims of Britain
 Kumail Nanjiani – Pakistani American stand-up comic and actor
 Taslima Nasrin – Bangladeshi author, feminist, human rights activist and secular humanist
 Armin Navabi – Iranian-born atheist and secular activist, author, podcaster and vlogger, known as founder of the popular website Atheist Republic.
 Aziz Nesin – Turkish humorist and author of more than 100 books
Barack Obama Sr. – Kenyan senior governmental economist, and the father of Barack Obama
 Catherine Perez-Shakdam – French Jewish journalist, political analyst and commentator; formerly a marital convert to Sunni Islam
 Ibn al-Rawandi – 9th-century early skeptic of Shia Islam, of Persian origin
 Salman Rushdie – British-Indian novelist and essayist
 Nyamko Sabuni – Politician in Sweden
 Zohra Sehgal – Indian actress who has appeared in several Hindi and English language films
 Anwar Shaikh – British author of Pakistani descent
 Dr. Younus Shaikh – Pakistani medical doctor, human rights activist, rationalist and free-thinker
 Ali Soilih – Comorian socialist revolutionary; president of the Comoros
 Wafa Sultan – Syrian-born American psychiatrist; controversial critic of Islam; describes herself as a "secular humanist"
 Arzu Toker – Turkish-born German writer, journalist, publicist and translator; founder of the German organization Central Council of Ex-Muslims
 Cenk Uygur – Turkish-American co-founder and main host of the progressive talk radio show The Young Turks; agnostic
 Ibn Warraq – British Pakistani secularist author; founder of the Institute for the Secularisation of Islamic Society
 Rishvin Ismath – Sri Lankan atheist & humanist; co-founder of Council of Ex-Muslims of Sri Lanka

Former Shintos

References 

Lists of religious skeptics
Nontheism